Scapanocnema is a genus of flies in the family Stratiomyidae.

Species
Scapanocnema spathulipes Enderlein, 1914

References

Stratiomyidae
Brachycera genera
Taxa named by Günther Enderlein
Diptera of Asia
Monotypic Brachycera genera